Thekedar Madan Lal Jalalpur (born 19 August 1959) is an Indian politician and a member of INC. In the 2017 Punjab Legislative Assembly election, he was elected as the member of the Punjab Legislative Assembly from Ghanaur.

Member of Legislative Assembly
He won the Ghanaur Assembly constituency on an INC ticket, he beat the member of the Punjab Legislative Assembly Harpreet Kaur Mukhmailpur of the SAD by over 36557 votes.

Madan Lal Jalalpur has been inducted in the new Punjab Cabinet post-resignation of Cpt. Amarinder Singh.

Electoral performance

References

Living people
Indian politicians
Punjab, India MLAs 2017–2022
1959 births
Indian National Congress politicians
People from Punjab, India
Indian National Congress politicians from Punjab, India